Paul William Danahy Jr. (April 19, 1928 – February 1, 2022) was an American politician and judge from the state of Florida. He served in the Florida House of Representatives from 1967 to 1974, representing the 67th district. He was later a judge on the Florida District Court of Appeals. Danahy died in Tampa, Florida on February 1, 2022, at the age of 93.

Danahy was born in Hopkinton, Massachusetts. He grew up in Hopkinton. He was accepted to Boston College. He then received a scholarship from University of Tampa where he graduated from in 1951. He received his law degree from University of Florida in 1957 and was admitted to the Florida bar. He served in the United States Army and the United States Marine Corps. Danahy lived in Tampa, Florida with his wife and family.

References

1928 births
2022 deaths
Judges of the Florida District Courts of Appeal
Democratic Party members of the Florida House of Representatives
Boston College alumni
University of Florida alumni
University of Tampa alumni
Politicians from Tampa, Florida
People from Hopkinton, Massachusetts
Military personnel from Florida
Military personnel from Massachusetts